Amabilis (derived from Latin amabilis, "lovable") may refer to:

People  
Amabilis of Riom (Amable), French saint
Jonathan Amabilis, Mexican musician 
Sister Amabilis, religious name of Annie Chambers Ketchum (1824-1904), American educator, lecturer, writer

Science  
Amabilis (turtle), an extinct genus of turtles